Accession has different definitions depending upon its application.

In property law, it is a mode of acquiring property that involves the addition of value to property through labour or the addition of new materials. For example, a person who owns a property on a river delta also takes ownership of any additional land that builds up along the riverbank due to natural deposits or man made deposits.

In commercial law, accession includes goods that are physically united with other goods in such a manner that the identity of the original goods is not lost. In English common law, the added value belongs to the original property's owner. For example, if the buyer of a car has parts added or replaced and the buyer then fails to make scheduled payments and the car is repossessed, the buyer has no right to the new parts because they have become a part of the whole car.

In modern common law, if the property owner allows the accession through bad faith, the adder of value is entitled to damages or title to the property. If the individual who adds value to the owner's chattel (personal property) is a trespasser or does so in bad faith, the owner retains title and the trespasser cannot recover labor or materials. The owner of the chattel may seek conversion damages for the value of the original materials plus any consequential damages. Alternatively, the owner may seek replevin (return of the chattel). However, the owner may be limited to damages if the property has changed its nature by accession. For example, if a finder discovers a gemstone and in good faith believes it to be abandoned and then cuts it and integrates it into a work of art, the true owner may be limited to recovery of damages for the value of the gemstone but not of the final art piece by way of replevin. The remedies and application of the law vary by legal jurisdiction.

Roman accession 

Accession might also be (from Latin accedere, to go to, approach), in law, a method of acquiring property adopted from Roman law (see: accessio), by which, in things that have a close connection with or dependence on one another, the property of the principal draws after it the property of the accessory, according to the principle, accessio cedet principali.

Accession may take place either in a natural way, such as the growth of fruit or the pregnancy of animals, or in an artificial way. The various methods may be classified as:
 Land to land by accretion or alluvion
 Movables to land or fixtures
 Movables to movables
 Movables added to by the art or industry of man

Accession in relation to land
The general principle was that everything acceded to the land, since the land was the principal.

Buildings (inaedificatio)
Ownership of the house was considered distinct from ownership of the materials used to make the house. Owners of the materials were permitted to vindicate the materials upon demolition of the house, but the demolition of the house was forbidden by the Twelve Tables.

Where X built on X's land using Y's materials, X owned the house since it acceded to X's land. Y would be capable of laying one of two actions if X was in good faith (bona fides) in using Y's materials, but two actions if X was in bad faith (mala fides). These actions were (i) the rei vindicatio for the materials and (ii) the actio de tigno, which would recoup twice the value of the materials. Additionally, Y would also have an action against a third party if that third party stole the materials.

In A Text-Book of Roman Law from Augustus to Justinian, W. W. Buckland discusses a third situation where X builds on Y's land using Z's materials. In such a situation, Buckland suggests that in relation to Y, X should be treated as though an XYX situation has occurred, and in relation to Z, as though an XXZ situation has occurred.

Plants and seeds
X's plants (implantatio) and seeds (satio) acceded irreversibly to Y's soil once they have taken root, but Y must pay expenses if X is in legal possession, since X will have the exceptio dolus malus against Y's rei vindicatio.

Rivers and new islands
 Alluvion
 Avulsion

Accession in relation to movables
The accessory accedes to the principal. The debate is generally over which is the principal and which is the accessory. The principal owner owns regardless of good faith, bad faith, or consent. Possible tests that could be adopted in deciding this question include:
 Economic value
 Size
 Physical identity
 Relative non-economic value in terms of aesthetic value or labor

In Roman law, there was no consistency. Everything was decided on a casuistic basis. The Physical Identity test was the dominant test, i.e., the principal is that which gives its name to the final product and the accessory is that which has its identity merged and lost in the identity of the other. However, there are a number of special cases with special, and rather idiosyncratic rules, which are as follows:

 Writing (scriptura) and painting (pictura)
 Threads and garments (textura)
 Confusion of goods (confusio) and commixture (commixtio)

References

Property law